This is a complete list of people who have served as Lord Lieutenant of Tyne and Wear, since the creation of the county on 1 April 1974:

James Steel (1 April 1974 to 1984)
Sir Ralph Carr-Ellison (1984 to 2000)
Sir Nigel Sherlock (2000 to 2015)
Susan Margaret Winfield (2015 to 2022)
Lucy Winskell (from 18 May 2022)

References

External links 
Tyne & Wear Lieutenacy - official site

Tyne and Wear
 
1974 establishments in England